The Golden Bell Award for Best Reality or Game Show is one of the categories of the competition for Taiwanese television production, Golden Bell Awards. It has been awarded since 2017.

Winners

2020s

References

Reality or Game Show, Best
Golden Bell Awards, Best Reality or Game Show